Inhalation is a major route of exposure that occurs when an individual breathes in polluted air which enters the respiratory tract.   Identification of the pollutant uptake by the respiratory system can determine how the resulting exposure contributes to the  dose.  In this way, the mechanism of pollutant uptake by the respiratory system can be used to predict potential health impacts within the human population.

Definition
Exposure is commonly understood to be the concentration of the airborne pollutant in the air at the mouth and nose boundary. Outdoor concentrations are often measured at fixed sites or estimated with models. The fraction of this ambient concentration that is inhaled by a person depends mainly on their location (indoor or outdoor), distance to pollution sources and their minute ventilation. Traditionally exposure is estimated based on outdoor concentrations at the residential address. Trips to other locations and physical activity level are mostly neglected although some recent studies have attempted to use portable and wearable sensors.

Intake dose is the mass of the pollutant that crosses the contact boundary and is inhaled by the individual.    Some of this pollutant is exhaled, and the fraction that is absorbed by the respiratory system is known as the absorbed dose.  A portion of the pollutant may also be expelled by sneezing, coughing, spitting, or swallowing.  The remaining  pollutant that is transported through the liquid layer, making contact with the respiratory tract tissues is the fraction of bioavailability, called the effective dose.

Major pollutants of concern

In 1970, the Clean Air Act Amendments set six criteria air pollutants which are updated periodically by the National Air Quality Standards (NAAQS) and the U.S Environmental Protection Agency (USEPA).  The six criteria pollutants were identified based on scientific knowledge of health effects caused by the pollutants.  The six criteria are the following:  particulate matter (PM), nitrogen oxide , ozone , sulfur dioxide , carbon monoxide (CO), and nonmethane hydrocarbons (NHMC).  Particulate matter (PM) is divided into two sizes, PM10 which is called inhalable PM, and  PM2.5, which is called fine PM.

Uptake of gaseous pollutants

The absorption and diffusion of gases is a bidirectional process. Once the gases are absorbed into the mucus or surfactant layer, the dissolved gases can desorb back to the air in the lungs. Gases may diffuse in either direction depending on the concentration gradient between the two layers. Gases may react chemically during transport into the bloodstream.

Ozone and CO, have lower aqueous solubilities and higher resistance to mass transfer. Ozone is the most reactive, reducing mass transfer into tissue and blood. CO has the slowest uptake and the highest resistance into the terminal bronchioles.

Uptake of particulate pollutants
The deposition of particulate pollutants into the lungs is necessary before the particles can travel through the mucus into the lung tissue. There are four mechanisms of deposition:  interception, impaction, gravitational settling, and Brownian diffusion.  Interception happens when a particle is removed after brushing up against an obstacle. Impaction happens when the particle collides into the surface of the respiratory tract due to the high inertia.  Gravitational settling is influenced by the force of gravity which causes the particle to settle on the respiratory tract.  Brownian motion causes the random collision of gas molecules against the particle, until the particle goes into the respiratory tract.

Prediction of the location of particle deposition into the respiratory tract depends on the size and type of particle.  Coarse particles, originating from natural sources such as dust, sand and gravel, tend to deposit in the nasal-pharyngeal region. Fine particles, derived from anthropogenic sources such as fossil fuels and smoking, typically deposit in the pulmonary region.  Most gas exchange occurs in the pulmonary region due to the alveoli, which contain a large surface area.

Health impacts of particulate pollutants

Scientists have identified a positive correlation between particulate matter concentrations being the causative factor of respiratory and cardiovascular disease.  Particulate matter may also be responsible for as many as 20,000 deaths annually, and exacerbation of asthma.  Quantification of dose, determining total number of particles deposited in the pulmonary region, surface area of particles, acidity of particles, and shape are important in determining health impacts.  A larger surface area will cause more toxins to be available for absorption into the mucus.  Particles such as asbestos have the ability to become permanently enlodged into the alveoli causing cancer in some cases.

Soluble particulate matter can be highly detrimental to the respirator tract because of their ability to dissolve into the mucus or surfactant layer.  This can irritate tissues by changing pH, and transport into the rest of the body or gastrointestinal tract.  Insoluble PM, such as lead particles, deposit in the nasal-pharyngeal region and can be cleared by blowing, sniffling, or spitting.  However, swallowing can cause the particles to deposit into th GI tract.  Particles in the tracheobronchial region can be cleared by the cilia, which will move particles into the mucus.   Insoluble particles that enter the pulmonary region cause swelling  of the alveoli, coughing, and shortness of breath.

Uptake of carbon monoxide

Carbon monoxide is a relatively nonreactive gas with limited solubility.  High CO levels build up in the pulmonary region over several hours, and equilibrate with inhaled CO concentrations.  Exposure to carbon monoxide is dangerous because of its toxic, odorless nature.  Since the gas takes time to build up in the pulmonary region, an inhaled concentration of 600 ppm would cause a headache and reduce mental capacity within an hour, without any other symptoms.  Eventually, the substance would induce a coma.  Equilibrium of CO in the blood is reached between 6–8 hours of exposure to constant concentration in the air.

A baseline level of carboxyhemoglobin, (COHb) is contained in the blood due to small quantities of CO as a by-product in the body.  The total amount of COHb present within the body is equivalent to the COHb baseline level in addition to the COHb exogenous level.

[COHb] total = [COHb] bas + [COHb] exo

References

Sources 

^ 1. Ott, W. R., Steinemann, A. C., & Wallace, L. A. (2007). Biomarkers of exposure. In W. R. Ott, A. C. Steinemann & L. A. Wallace (Eds.), Exposure analysis (pp. 395–404). Boca Raton, FL: Taylor & Francis.

External links 
  - Clean Air Act (EPA)
 - National Ambient Air Quality Standards (NAAQS)
 -Exposure Factors Handbook] by the US EPA
Inhalation disorders Institution of Occupational Safety and Health Toolkit
Trends in inhalation exposure: mid 1980s till present by K Creely and others. Health and Safety Executive Research Report RR460/2006

Pollution
Occupational safety and health